Sherlock Holmes is a character created by Sir Arthur Conan Doyle.

Sherlock Holmes may also refer to:

Film 
Sherlock Holmes (1916 film), starring William Gillette
Sherlock Holmes (Stoll film series), starring Eille Norwood
Sherlock Holmes (1922 film), starring John Barrymore
Sherlock Holmes (1931 film series), starring Arthur Wontner
Sherlock Holmes (1932 film), starring Clive Brook
The Grey Lady (film), also known as Sherlock Holmes, a 1937 German mystery film
Sherlock Holmes (1939 film series), starring Basil Rathbone and Nigel Bruce
Sherlock Holmes (2009 film), starring Robert Downey, Jr. and Jude Law
Sherlock Holmes (soundtrack), the soundtrack album
Sherlock Holmes: A Game of Shadows, the 2011 sequel to the 2009 film
Sherlock Holmes: A Game of Shadows (soundtrack)
Sherlock Holmes (2010 film), a direct-to-DVD film starring Ben Syder and Gareth David-Lloyd

Television 
Sherlock Holmes (1951 TV series), a BBC production starring Alan Wheatley
Sherlock Holmes (1954 TV series), an American production, filmed in France, starring Ronald Howard
Sherlock Holmes (1965 TV series), a British production with Peter Cushing and Douglas Wilmer portraying Holmes in different years
Sherlock Holmes (1967 TV series), a German production starring Erich Schellow
Sherlock Holmes (1968 TV series), an Italian production starring Nando Gazzolo
Sherlock Holmes (1984 TV series), a British production starring Jeremy Brett
Sherlock Holmes (2013 TV series), a Russian television adaptation
Sherlock Holmes (2014 TV series), a 2014 Japanese puppetry TV series written by Koki Mitani

Other uses
Sherlock Holmes (play), an 1899 play written by and starring William Gillette
Sherlock Holmes of Baker Street, a 1962 novel by William S. Baring-Gould
Sherlock Holmes: The Unauthorized Biography, a 2005 novel by Nick Rennison
The Sherlock Holmes, a public house in Northumberland Street, London

See also 
Adaptations of Sherlock Holmes